HMS Racer was the American schooner Independence, launched in 1811 in New York, that the British Royal Navy captured in 1812 and took into service. She was wrecked in the Florida Straits on 10 October 1814.

Capture
 captured the American schooner Independence, of 213 tons (bm), four guns, and 23 men, on 9 November 1812. Independence had been sailing from Bayonne to New York with a cargo of brandy, silks, etc. Although British records report that she was a privateer, she was at most a letter of marque, though she does not appear in a compendium of American privateers and letters of marque.

Career and loss
Her first commander, in 1813 to 1814, was Lieutenant J. Jullan. Lieutenant Henry Freeman Young Pogson replaced Jullan. She underwent small repairs at Plymouth between January and August 1813.

The Marquis of Wellington requested a naval demonstration on 10 November 1813 at Socoa in the rear of the French lines of communication. However, the swell was so heavy that the naval vessels could do little beyond exchanging fire with the shore batteries there.

Fate
Racer was cruising off the southern American coast when a large privateer chased her. Racer escaped but when Pogson decided to return to Jamaica she wrecked on the Cay Sal Bank in the Florida Straits. Pogson got his men on to the Cay. He then sailed a small boat to Nassau, Bahamas, and brought back assistance.

Post-script
Parliament voted a special grant to the officers and crews that served under Admiral Lord Viscount Keith on the north coast of Spain and the coast of France in the years 1812, 1813, and 1814. Racer was among the many vessels that qualified for the grant for service in 1813 and 1814.

Notes, citations, and references
Notes

Citations

References
 
 
 

1811 ships
Ships built in the United States
Captured ships
Schooners of the Royal Navy
Maritime incidents in 1814